Town Brookhaven is a  mixed-use district developed by the Sembler Company, located on a 54-acre site at Peachtree Road and Town Boulevard (formerly Cross Keys Drive) in Brookhaven, Georgia, adjacent to Oglethorpe University. Major commercial tenants include Cobb Theatres Cine'bistro (a luxury dinner-and-a-movie theatre), Costco, Marshalls, an LA Fitness gym, and a Publix supermarket.

References

Mixed-use developments in Georgia (U.S. state)
Brookhaven, Georgia
Community shopping centers